NRP Corte Real or Corte-Real has been the name of more than one Portuguese Navy ship, and may refer to:
 , a frigate in commission from 1957 to 1968; previously served in the United States Navy as 
 , a frigate in commission since 1992

Portuguese Navy ship names